Triton Central High School is a public high school located approximately 2 miles northwest of Fairland, Indiana.

Athletics
Triton Central High School's athletic teams are the Tigers and they compete in the Indiana Crossroads Conference. The school offers a wide range of athletics including:

Baseball
Basketball (Men's and Women's)
Cheerleading
Cross Country
Football
Golf (Men's and Women's)
Soccer
Softball
Tennis (Men's and Women's)
Track and Field (Men's and Women's)
Volleyball
Wrestling
Conference History

Baseball
The 2002-2003 Baseball team won the IHSAA 2A State Championship with Rob Robertson as head coach.

See also
 List of high schools in Indiana

References

External links
 Official website

Buildings and structures in Shelby County, Indiana
Schools in Shelby County, Indiana
Public high schools in Indiana